Karnataka is an Indian state.

Karnataka may also refer to:
 Karnataka (band), a British rock band
 Karnataka (album)
 Karnataka Bank, a banking institution based in Mangaluru, Karnataka

See also
 Carnatic (disambiguation)